Elections to Liverpool City Council were held on Thursday 1 November 1898. One third of the council seats were up for election, the term of office of each councillor being three years.

Sixteen of the twenty-eight wards were uncontested.

After the election, the composition of the council was:

Election result

Because of the large number of uncontested wards, these statistics should be taken in that context.

Ward results

* - Retiring Councillor seeking re-election

Comparisons are made with the 1895 election results, as the retiring councillors were elected in that year.

Abercromby

Breckfield

Brunswick

Castle Street

Dingle

Edge Hill

Everton

Exchange

Fairfield

Granby

Great George

Kensington

Kirkdale

Low Hill

Netherfield

North Scotland

North Walton

Prince's Park

Sandhills

St. Anne's

St. Domingo

St. Peter's

Sefton Park

South Scotland

South Walton

Vauxhall

Wavertree

West Derby

Aldermanic Elections

At the meeting of the Council on 9 November 1898, the terms of office of fourteen alderman expired. The following fourteen were elected as Aldermen by the Council (Aldermen and Councillors) on 9 November 1898 for a term of six years.

* - re-elected aldermen.

By-elections

Aldermanic By Election, 9 November 1898

Following the death of Alderman Arthur Bower Forwood Bart. MP, 
former councillor Herbert Campbell JP (Conservative, North Toxteth elected 1886, 1889 and 1892) was elected as an alderman by the council on 9 November 1898

.

No. 20, Great George, 25 November 1898

Caused by the election of Councillor Edward Paul (Liberal, Great George, elected 1 November 1898) as an alderman by the Council on 9 November 1898.

No. 13, North Scotland, 29 November 1898

Caused by the election of Councillor Edward Purcell (Irish Nationalist, North Scotland, elected 1 November 1896) as an alderman by the council (councillors and aldermen) on 9 November 1898.

No. 14, South Scotland, 29 November 1898

Caused by the death of Councillor Owen O'Hara (Irish Nationalist, South Scotland, elected 1 November 1896) on 11 November 1898.

No. 20, Great George, 10 February 1899

Caused by the death of Councillor Thomas Donnelly (Liberal, Great George, elected 1 November 1897) on 18 January 1899.

No.1, Sandhills, 17 March 1899

Caused by the resignation of Councillor William Nelson (Liberal, Sandhills, elected 1 November 1897) which was reported to the Council on 1 March 1899.

No. 14, South Scotland, 28 April 1899

The election of George Jeremy Lynskey (Irish Nationalist, South Scotland, elected unopposed 1 November 1898) 
was declared void by the Queen's Bench Division of the High Court of Justice 15 April 1899
.

No. 15, Vauxhall, 19 May 1899

Caused by the death of Councillor Thomas Flynn (Irish Nationalist, Vauxhall, elected 1 November 1897) on 3 May 1899.

No. 14, South Scotland, 

Caused by the death of Councillor Robert Thompson (Irish Nationalist, South Scotland, elected 1 November 1896)
 on 21 July 1899.

No. 26, Dingle, 10 October 1899

Caused by the resignation of Alderman Joseph Bond Morgan (Conservative, elected by the council as an alderman on 9 November 1895)

Councillor Thomas Evans (Conservative, Dingle, elected 1 November 1897)
 was elected by the Council (Councillors and Aldermen) as an Alderman on 6 September 1899
.

No. 19, St. Peter's, October 1899

The resignation of Alderman Jeremiah Miles (Liberal, elected 9 November 1898) was reported to the Council on 4 October 1899. Councillor William Henry Watts (Liberal St. Peter's, elected 1 November 1897) was elected as an alderman by the council on 4 October 1899.

See also

 Liverpool City Council
 Liverpool Town Council elections 1835 - 1879
 Liverpool City Council elections 1880–present
 Mayors and Lord Mayors of Liverpool 1207 to present
 History of local government in England

References

1898
1898 English local elections
November 1898 events
1890s in Liverpool